14+ is a 2015 Russian coming-of-age romantic film produced by the Cinema Foundation of Russia. It was first shown at  the 2015 Berlin International Film Festival. It is about a teenage boy feeling infatuation for the first time.

Cast
 as Lyosha
Ulyana Vaskovich as Vika
 as Lyosha's mother
Dmitry Barinov as Dron
Kseniya Pakhomova as Rusalka
Daniil Pikula as Vityok
Elizaveta Makedonskaya as Katya
Aleksey Filimonov as Volkov

References

External links
 

2015 films
2010s coming-of-age drama films
2015 romantic drama films
Russian coming-of-age drama films
Russian romantic drama films